Badbaado FC is a Somali football club based in Mogadishu, Somalia.

References

Football clubs in Somalia
Sport in Mogadishu